Avenliq (also Romanized as Āvenlīq and Avenlīq; also known as Avīnlīq) is a village in Tirchai Rural District of Kandovan District, Mianeh County, East Azerbaijan province, Iran. At the 2006 National Census, its population was 1,647 in 477 households. The following census in 2011 counted 1,797 people in 530 households. The latest census in 2016 showed a population of 1,774 people in 564 households; it was the largest village in its rural district.

References 

Meyaneh County

Populated places in East Azerbaijan Province

Populated places in Meyaneh County